The 1896–97 Bucknell Bison men's basketball team represented Bucknell University during the 1896–97 college men's basketball season. The team had finished with an overall record of 4–1.

Schedule

|-

References

Bucknell Bison men's basketball seasons
Bucknell
Bucknell
Bucknell